John Farrar (born 1945) is an Australian-born musician.

John Farrar may also refer to:

John Farrar (scientist) (1779–1853), professor of mathematics and natural philosophy at Harvard 
John Farrar (minister) (1802–1884), British Methodist minister
John C. Farrar (1896–1974), American editor, writer and publisher
John Percy Farrar (1857–1929), English soldier and mountaineer
John Nutting Farrar (1839–1913), American dentist